Thor's Hammer is a weapon in Norse mythology.

Thor's Hammer may also refer to:

Entertainment
Thor's Hammer (Stargate SG-1), an episode of the television program Stargate SG-1
The Thor's Hammer Organization, principal antagonists of the Silent Storm video game series.
Thor's Hammer (Tusenfryd), a motion-based 3D dark ride at the Tusenfryd theme park in Norway

Landmarks
 Thor's Hammer, a natural rock formation in Bryce Canyon National Park
 Hammer of Thor (monument), a piled rock monument in northern Quebec, said to be of Norse construction

Literature
Thor's Hammer (novel), a science fiction novel by Wynne Whiteford
Thor's Hammer (The Voyage of the Basset), a fantasy novel by Will Shetterly

Music
Thor's Hammer (band), a garage rock band from Iceland
Thorr's Hammer, a death/doom band from Ballard, Washington

Other
 ASCI Thor's Hammer, an internal codename for the Cray Red Storm supercomputer

People 
Ingemar Johansson, former Swedish world champion in heavyweight boxing nicknamed Thor's hammer or hammer of Thor

See also
The Hammer of Thor, a fantasy novel
"The Hammer of Thor," a song by Týr on the album Ragnarok
Mjolnir (disambiguation)